This is a list of amphibians found in the United States. A total of 306 amphibian species have been recorded in the United States, 2 of which are now extinct. This list is derived from the database listing of Amphibian Species of the World.

Salamanders (Caudata)

Ambystomatidae 

Order: Caudata. 
Family: Ambystomatidae
 Ambystoma annulatum Cope, 1886
 Ambystoma barbouri Kraus & Petranka, 1989
 Ambystoma bishopi Goin, 1950
 Ambystoma californiense Gray, 1853
 Ambystoma cingulatum Cope, 1868
 Ambystoma gracile (Baird, 1859)
 Ambystoma jeffersonianum (Green, 1827)
 Ambystoma laterale Hallowell, 1856
 Ambystoma mabeei Bishop, 1928
 Ambystoma macrodactylum Baird, 1850
 Ambystoma maculatum (Shaw, 1802)
 Ambystoma mavortium Baird, 1850
 Ambystoma opacum (Gravenhorst, 1807)
 Ambystoma talpoideum (Holbrook, 1838)
 Ambystoma texanum (Matthes, 1855)
 Ambystoma tigrinum (Green, 1825)
 Dicamptodon aterrimus (Cope, 1868)
 Dicamptodon copei Nussbaum, 1970
 Dicamptodon ensatus (Eschscholtz, 1833)
 Dicamptodon tenebrosus (Baird & Girard, 1852)

Amphiumidae 

Order: Caudata. 
Family: Amphiumidae
 Amphiuma means Garden, 1821
 Amphiuma pholeter Neill, 1964
 Amphiuma tridactylum Cuvier, 1827

Cryptobranchidae 

Order: Caudata. 
Family: Cryptobranchidae
 Cryptobranchus alleganiensis (Sonnini de Manoncourt & Latreille, 1801)
 Cryptobranchus bishopi Grobman, 1943

Plethodontidae 

Order: Caudata. 
Family: Plethodontidae
 Batrachoseps altasierrae Jockusch, Martínez-Solano, Hansen, & Wake, 2012
 Batrachoseps attenuatus (Eschscholtz, 1833)
 Batrachoseps bramei Jockusch, Martínez-Solano, Hansen, & Wake, 2012
 Batrachoseps campi Marlow, Brode, & Wake, 1979
 Batrachoseps diabolicus Jockusch, Wake, & Yanev, 1998
 Batrachoseps gabrieli Wake, 1996
 Batrachoseps gavilanensis Jockusch, Yanev, & Wake, 2001
 Batrachoseps gregarius Jockusch, Wake, & Yanev, 1998
 Batrachoseps incognitus Jockusch, Yanev, & Wake, 2001
 Batrachoseps kawia Jockusch, Wake, & Yanev, 1998
 Batrachoseps luciae Jockusch, Yanev, & Wake, 2001
 Batrachoseps major Camp, 1915
 Batrachoseps minor Jockusch, Yanev, & Wake, 2001
 Batrachoseps nigriventris Cope, 1869
 Batrachoseps pacificus (Cope, 1865)
 Batrachoseps regius Jockusch, Wake, & Yanev, 1998
 Batrachoseps relictus Brame & Murray, 1968
 Batrachoseps robustus Wake, Yanev, & Hansen, 2002
 Batrachoseps simatus Brame & Murray, 1968
 Batrachoseps stebbinsi Brame & Murray, 1968
 Batrachoseps wrighti (Bishop, 1937)
 Eurycea aquatica Rose & Bush, 1963
 Eurycea arenicola (Stuart et al., 2020)
 Eurycea bislineata (Green, 1818)
 Eurycea chamberlaini Harrison & Guttman, 2003
 Eurycea chisholmensis Chippindale, Price, Wiens, & Hillis, 2000
 Eurycea cirrigera (Green, 1831)
 Eurycea guttolineata (Holbrook, 1838)
 Eurycea junaluska Sever, Dundee, & Sullivan, 1976
 Eurycea latitans Smith & Potter, 1946
 Eurycea longicauda (Green, 1818)
 Eurycea lucifuga Rafinesque, 1822
 Eurycea multiplicata (Cope, 1869)
 Eurycea nana Bishop, 1941
 Eurycea naufragia Chippindale, Price, Wiens, & Hillis, 2000
 Eurycea neotenes Bishop & Wright, 1937
 Eurycea pterophila Burger, Smith, & Potter, 1950
 Eurycea quadridigitata (Holbrook, 1842)
 Eurycea rathbuni (Stejneger, 1896)
 Eurycea robusta (Longley, 1978)
 Eurycea sosorum Chippindale, Price, & Hillis, 1993
 Eurycea spelaea (Stejneger, 1892)
 Eurycea subfluvicola  Steffen, Irwin, Blair, & Bonett, 2014
 Eurycea tonkawae Chippindale, Price, Wiens, & Hillis, 2000
 Eurycea tridentifera Mitchell & Reddell, 1965
 Eurycea troglodytes Baker, 1957
 Eurycea tynerensis Moore & Hughes, 1939
 Eurycea wallacei (Carr, 1939)
 Eurycea waterlooensis Hillis, Chamberlain, Wilcox, & Chippindale, 2001
 Eurycea wilderae Dunn, 1920
 Gyrinophilus gulolineatus Brandon, 1965
 Gyrinophilus palleucus McCrady, 1954
 Gyrinophilus porphyriticus (Green, 1827)
 Gyrinophilus subterraneus Besharse & Holsinger, 1977
 Hemidactylium scutatum (Temminck, 1838)
 Pseudotriton diastictus  Bishop, 1941
 Pseudotriton montanus Baird, 1850
 Pseudotriton ruber (Sonnini de Manoncourt & Latreille, 1801)
 Stereochilus marginatus (Hallowell, 1856)
 Urspelerpes brucei Camp, Peterman, Milanovich, Lamb, Maerz, & Wake, 2009
 Aneides aeneus (Cope & Packard, 1881)
 Aneides ferreus Cope, 1869
 Aneides flavipunctatus (Strauch, 1870)
 Aneides hardii (Taylor, 1941)
 Aneides iecanus (Cope, 1883)
 Aneides lugubris (Hallowell, 1849)
 Aneides niger  Myers & Maslin, 1948
 Aneides vagrans  Wake & Jackman, 1999
 Desmognathus abditus  Anderson & Tilley, 2003
 Desmognathus aeneus Brown & Bishop, 1947
 Desmognathus apalachicolae  Means & Karlin, 1989
 Desmognathus aureatus (Martof, 1956)
 Desmognathus auriculatus (Holbrook, 1838)
 Desmognathus brimleyorum Stejneger, 1895
 Desmognathus carolinensis Dunn, 1916
 Desmognathus conanti  Rossman, 1958
 Desmognathus folkertsi Camp, Tilley, Austin, & Marshall, 2002
 Desmognathus fuscus (Rafinesque, 1820)
 Desmognathus imitator Dunn, 1927
 Desmognathus marmoratus (Moore, 1899)
 Desmognathus melanius (Martof, 1956)
 Desmognathus monticola Dunn, 1916
 Desmognathus ochrophaeus Cope, 1859
 Desmognathus ocoee  Nicholls, 1949
 Desmognathus orestes Tilley & Mahoney, 1996
 Desmognathus organi  Crespi, Browne, & Rissler, 2010
 Desmognathus planiceps  Newman, 1955
 Desmognathus quadramaculatus (Holbrook, 1840)
 Desmognathus santeetlah  Tilley, 1981
 Desmognathus welteri  Barbour, 1950
 Desmognathus wrighti  King, 1936
 Ensatina eschscholtzii  Gray, 1850
 Hydromantes brunus  Gorman, 1954
 Hydromantes platycephalus (Camp, 1916)
 Hydromantes shastae Gorman & Camp, 1953
 Phaeognathus hubrichti Highton, 1961
 Plethodon ainsworthi  Lazell, 1998
 Plethodon albagula Grobman, 1944
 Plethodon amplus Highton & Peabody, 2000
 Plethodon angusticlavius Grobman, 1944
 Plethodon asupak  Mead, Clayton, Nauman, Olson, & Pfrender, 2005
 Plethodon aureolus Highton, 1984
 Plethodon caddoensis  Pope & Pope, 1951
 Plethodon chattahoochee Highton, 1989
 Plethodon cheoah Highton & Peabody, 2000
 Plethodon chlorobryonis  Mittleman, 1951
 Plethodon cinereus (Green, 1818)
 Plethodon cylindraceus (Harlan, 1825)
 Plethodon dorsalis Cope, 1889
 Plethodon dunni Bishop, 1934
 Plethodon electromorphus Highton, 1999
 Plethodon elongatus Van Denburgh, 1916
 Plethodon fourchensis Duncan & Highton, 1979
 Plethodon glutinosus (Green, 1818)
 Plethodon grobmani Allen & Neill, 1949
 Plethodon hoffmani Highton, 1972
 Plethodon hubrichti Thurow, 1957
 Plethodon idahoensis Slater & Slipp, 1940
 Plethodon jordani Blatchley, 1901
 Plethodon kentucki Mittleman, 1951
 Plethodon kiamichi Highton, 1989
 Plethodon kisatchie Highton, 1989
 Plethodon larselli Burns, 1954
 Plethodon meridianus Highton & Peabody, 2000
 Plethodon metcalfi Brimley, 1912
 Plethodon mississippi Highton, 1989
 Plethodon montanus Highton & Peabody, 2000
 Plethodon neomexicanus Stebbins & Riemer, 1950
 Plethodon nettingi Green, 1938
 Plethodon ocmulgee Highton, 1989
 Plethodon ouachitae Dunn & Heinze, 1933
 Plethodon petraeus Wynn, Highton, & Jacobs, 1988
 Plethodon punctatus Highton, 1972
 Plethodon richmondi Netting & Mittleman, 1938
 Plethodon savannah Highton, 1989
 Plethodon sequoyah Highton, 1989
 Plethodon serratus Grobman, 1944
 Plethodon shenandoah Highton & Worthington, 1967
 Plethodon sherando Highton, 2004
 Plethodon shermani Stejneger, 1906
 Plethodon stormi Highton & Brame, 1965
 Plethodon teyahalee Hairston, 1950
 Plethodon vandykei Van Denburgh, 1906
 Plethodon variolatus (Gilliams, 1818)
 Plethodon vehiculum (Cooper, 1860)
 Plethodon ventralis Highton, 1997
 Plethodon virginia Highton, 1999
 Plethodon websteri Highton, 1979
 Plethodon wehrlei Fowler & Dunn, 1917
 Plethodon welleri Walker, 1931
 Plethodon yonahlossee Dunn, 1917

Proteidae 
Order: Caudata. 
Family: Proteidae
 Necturus alabamensis Viosca, 1937
 Necturus beyeri Viosca, 1937
 Necturus lewisi Brimley, 1924
 Necturus lodingi Viosca, 1937
 Necturus louisianensis Viosca, 1938
 Necturus maculosus (Rafinesque, 1818)
 Necturus punctatus (Gibbes, 1850)

Rhyacotritonidae 
Order: Caudata. 
Family: Rhyacotritonidae
 Rhyacotriton cascadae Good & Wake, 1992
 Rhyacotriton kezeri Good & Wake, 1992
 Rhyacotriton olympicus (Gaige, 1917)
 Rhyacotriton variegatus Stebbins & Lowe, 1951

Salamandridae 
Order: Caudata. 
Family: Salamandridae

 Notophthalmus meridionalis (Cope, 1880)
 Notophthalmus perstriatus (Bishop, 1941)
 Notophthalmus viridescens (Rafinesque, 1820)
 Taricha granulosa (Skilton, 1849)
 Taricha rivularis (Twitty, 1935)
 Taricha sierrae (Twitty, 1942)
 Taricha torosa (Rathke, 1833)

Sirenidae 
Order: Caudata. 
Family: Sirenidae
 Pseudobranchus axanthus Netting & Goin, 1942
 Pseudobranchus striatus (LeConte, 1824)
 Siren intermedia Barnes, 1826
 Siren lacertina Österdam, 1766

Frogs and Toads (Anura)

Ascaphidae 
Order: Anura. 
Family: Ascaphidae
 Ascaphus montanus Mittleman & Myers, 1949
 Ascaphus truei Stejneger, 1899

Bufonidae 

Order: Anura. 
Family: Bufonidae
 Anaxyrus americanus (Holbrook, 1836)
 Anaxyrus baxteri (Porter, 1968)
 Anaxyrus boreas (Baird & Girard, 1852)
 Anaxyrus californicus (Camp, 1915)
 Anaxyrus canorus (Camp, 1916)
 Anaxyrus cognatus (Say, 1822)
 Anaxyrus debilis (Girard, 1854)
 Anaxyrus exsul (Myers, 1942)
 Anaxyrus fowleri (Hinckley, 1882)
 Anaxyrus hemiophrys (Cope, 1886)
 Anaxyrus houstonensis (Sanders, 1953)
 Anaxyrus microscaphus (Cope, 1867)
 Anaxyrus nelsoni (Stejneger, 1893)
 Anaxyrus punctatus (Baird & Girard, 1852)
 Anaxyrus quercicus (Holbrook, 1840)
 Anaxyrus retiformis (Sanders & Smith, 1951)
 Anaxyrus speciosus (Girard, 1854)
 Anaxyrus terrestris (Bonnaterre, 1789)
 Anaxyrus woodhousii (Girard, 1854)
 Incilius alvarius (Girard, 1859)
 Incilius nebulifer (Girard, 1854)
 Rhinella marina (Linnaeus, 1758)

Craugastoridae 

Order: Anura. 
Family: Craugastoridae
 Craugastor augusti (Dugès, 1879)

Dendrobatidae 

Order: Anura. 
Family: Dendrobatidae
 Dendrobates auratus (Girard, 1855)

Eleutherodactylidae 

Order: Anura. 
Family: Eleutherodactylidae
 Eleutherodactylus coqui Thomas, 1966
 Eleutherodactylus cystignathoides (Cope, 1877)
 Eleutherodactylus guttilatus (Cope, 1879)
 Eleutherodactylus marnockii (Cope, 1878)
 Eleutherodactylus planirostris (Cope, 1862)

Hylidae 

Order: Anura. 
Family: Hylidae
 Acris blanchardi  Harper, 1947
 Acris crepitans Baird, 1854
 Acris gryllus (LeConte, 1825)
 Hyla andersonii Baird, 1854
 Hyla arenicolor Cope, 1866
 Hyla avivoca Viosca, 1928
 Hyla chrysoscelis Cope, 1880
 Hyla cinerea (Schneider, 1799)
 Hyla femoralis Daudin, 1800
 Hyla gratiosa LeConte, 1856
 Hyla squirella Daudin, 1800
 Hyla versicolor LeConte, 1825
 Hyla wrightorum  Taylor, 1939
 Osteopilus septentrionalis (Duméril & Bibron, 1841)
 Pseudacris brachyphona (Cope, 1889)
 Pseudacris brimleyi  Brandt & Walker, 1933
 Pseudacris cadaverina (Cope, 1866)
 Pseudacris clarkii (Baird, 1854)
 Pseudacris crucifer (Wied-Neuwied, 1838)
 Pseudacris fouquettei  Lemmon, Lemmon, Collins, & Cannatella, 2008
 Pseudacris hypochondriaca (Hallowell, 1854)
 Pseudacris illinoensis Smith, 1951
 Pseudacris kalmi  Harper, 1955
 Pseudacris maculata (Agassiz, 1850)
 Pseudacris nigrita (LeConte, 1825)
 Pseudacris ocularis (Holbrook, 1838)
 Pseudacris ornata (Holbrook, 1836)
 Pseudacris regilla (Baird & Girard, 1852)
 Pseudacris sierra (Jameson, Mackey, & Richmond, 1966)
 Pseudacris streckeri Wright & Wright, 1933
 Pseudacris triseriata (Wied-Neuwied, 1838)
 Smilisca baudinii (Duméril & Bibron, 1841)
 Smilisca fodiens (Boulenger, 1882)
 Litoria caerulea (White, 1790)

Leptodactylidae 

Order: Anura. 
Family: Leptodactylidae 
 Leptodactylus fragilis (Brocchi, 1877)

Microhylidae 

Order: Anura. 
Family: Microhylidae
 Gastrophryne carolinensis (Holbrook, 1835)
 Gastrophryne mazatlanensis (Taylor, 1943)
 Gastrophryne olivacea (Hallowell, 1856)
 Hypopachus variolosus (Cope, 1866)

Pipidae 

Order: Anura. 
Family: Pipidae 
 Xenopus laevis (Daudin, 1802)

Ranidae 

Order: Anura. 
Family: Ranidae
 Glandirana rugosa (Temminck & Schlegel, 1838)
 Lithobates areolatus (Baird & Girard, 1852)
 Lithobates berlandieri (Baird, 1859)
 Lithobates blairi (Mecham, Littlejohn, Oldham, Brown, & Brown, 1973)
 Lithobates capito (LeConte, 1855)
 Lithobates catesbeianus (Shaw, 1802)
 Lithobates chiricahuensis (Platz & Mecham, 1979)
 Lithobates clamitans (Latreille, 1801)
 Lithobates fisheri (Stejneger, 1893)
 Lithobates grylio (Stejneger, 1901)
 Lithobates heckscheri (Wright, 1924)
 Lithobates okaloosae (Moler, 1985)
 Lithobates onca (Cope, 1875)
 Lithobates palustris (LeConte, 1825)
 Lithobates pipiens (Schreber, 1782)
 Lithobates septentrionalis (Baird, 1854)
 Lithobates sevosus (Goin & Netting, 1940)
 Lithobates sphenocephalus (Cope, 1886)
 Lithobates sylvaticus (LeConte, 1825)
 Lithobates tarahumarae (Boulenger, 1917)
 Lithobates virgatipes (Cope, 1891)
 Lithobates yavapaiensis (Platz & Frost, 1984)
 Rana aurora Baird & Girard, 1852
 Rana boylii Baird, 1854
 Rana cascadae Slater, 1939
 Rana draytonii Baird & Girard, 1852
 Rana luteiventris Thompson, 1913
 Rana muscosa Camp, 1917
 Rana pretiosa Baird & Girard, 1853
 Rana sierrae Camp, 1917

Rhinophrynidae 
Order: Anura. 
Family: Rhinophrynidae
 Rhinophrynus dorsalis Duméril & Bibron, 1841

Scaphiopodidae 

Order: Anura. 
Family: Scaphiopodidae
 Scaphiopus couchii Baird, 1854
 Scaphiopus holbrookii (Harlan, 1835)
 Scaphiopus hurterii Strecker, 1910
 Spea bombifrons (Cope, 1863)
 Spea hammondii (Baird, 1859)
 Spea intermontana (Cope, 1883)
 Spea multiplicata (Cope, 1863)

See also 
List of amphibians native to the United States by state:

Notes

References 

 
 
United States